An Iron Rose (1998) is a novel by Australian author Peter Temple.

Dedication
"For Josephine Margaret Temple and Alexander Royden Harold Wakefield Temple : first and best influences."

Reviews

 "Echoes from a Distant Mountain" 
 "The Daily Telegraph" 
 "Reviewing the Evidence" 

1998 Australian novels
Novels by Peter Temple
Australian crime novels
HarperCollins books